Berkeh-ye Soltan (also Romanized as Berkeh-ye Solṭān and Berkehsolṭān) is a village in Kohurestan Rural District, in the Central District of Khamir County, Hormozgan Province, Iran. At the 2006 census, its population was 291, in 65 families.

References 

Populated places in Khamir County